Peter Mráz (born 4 May 1985) is a Slovak football defender.

In summer 2009, he was transferred from FC Zenit Čáslav to SK Kladno.

References

External links

1985 births
Living people
Slovak footballers
OFK 1948 Veľký Lapáš players
FC Spartak Trnava players
SK Kladno players
Slovak Super Liga players
Association football defenders
People from Nové Zámky
Sportspeople from the Nitra Region